The 2017-2018 GNF2 was the 56th season of Botola 2, the second division of the Moroccan football league.

Team change

Teams relegated from 2016–17 Botola
 JS de Kasbah Tadla
 KAC Kénitra

Teams promoted from 2016–17 GNFA 1
 Chabab Ben Guerir
 US Musulmane d'Oujda

Table 

Botola seasons